Paul Fitzgerald (born 7 January 1963) is an Irish boxer. He competed at the 1984 Summer Olympics and the 1988 Summer Olympics.

References

1963 births
Living people
Irish male boxers
Olympic boxers of Ireland
Boxers at the 1984 Summer Olympics
Boxers at the 1988 Summer Olympics
Place of birth missing (living people)
Featherweight boxers